Badcoe is a single-member electoral district for the South Australian House of Assembly. It was created by the redistribution conducted in 2016, and was contested for the first time at the 2018 state election.

At its creation, Badcoe was projected to be notionally held by the Labor Party with a swing of 4.2% required to lose it.

Badcoe is named after Peter John Badcoe  (1934–1967) who grew up in Adelaide before joining the Australian Army in 1952. He served in artillery and infantry and was killed in the Vietnam War.

Badcoe was created as a replacement for Ashford, which was abolished at the 2018 state election. In February 2017 the member for Ashford, Steph Key, announced that she did not intend to contest the 2018 election.

Members for Badcoe

Election results

Notes

References
 ECSA profile for Badcoe: 2022
 ABC profile for Badcoe: 2018
 Poll Bludger profile for Badcoe: 2018

Badcoe
2018 establishments in Australia